Ender's Game is a 2013 American military science-fiction action film based on Orson Scott Card's 1985 novel of the same name. Written and directed by Gavin Hood, the film stars Asa Butterfield as Andrew "Ender" Wiggin, an unusually gifted child who is sent to an advanced military academy in space to prepare for a future alien invasion. The supporting cast includes Harrison Ford, Hailee Steinfeld, and Viola Davis, with Abigail Breslin and Ben Kingsley.

The film was released in Germany on October 24, 2013, followed by a release in the UK one day later. It was released in the United States, Canada, and several other countries on November 1, 2013, and was released in other territories by January 2014. Ender's Game received mixed reviews from critics and was a box-office bomb, grossing only $125.5 million on a $110–115 million budget.

Plot 
In the future, humanity is preparing to launch an attack on the homeworld of an alien race, called the Formics, that had attacked Earth and killed millions. The Formic invasion was stopped by Mazer Rackham, who crashed his fighter plane into the Formic queenship at the apparent cost of his life. Over the course of 50 years, gifted children are trained by the International Fleet to become commanders of a new fleet for this counterattack.

Cadet Andrew "Ender" Wiggin draws the attention of Colonel Hyrum Graff and Major Gwen Anderson because of his aptitude in simulated space combat and is recruited into Battle School.

Graff brings Ender to Battle School and places Ender with other cadets his age, but treats him as extraordinary, thereby subjecting him to being ostracized by the others. The cadets are placed in squads and perform training games in a zero-gravity "Battle Room". Ender quickly adapts to the games, devising new strategies older students have not yet seen.

Graff reassigns Ender to Salamander Army, led by Commander Bonzo Madrid. Bonzo, believing that Ender is inept and a liability, prevents him from training with the rest of the squad. Another cadet, Petra Arkanian, takes Ender under her wing and trains him privately.  In the next match, Bonzo benches Ender while the rest of the Salamander Army fights another team. However, seeing the team losing and Petra in trouble, Ender comes to her aid and helps Salamander Army win.

Meanwhile, Ender plays a computerized "mind game" set in a fantasy world, which presents difficult choices to the player. In one situation, Ender creates an outside the box solution to overcome a seemingly unsolvable problem. Later, he encounters a Formic in the game, and then simulated images involving his siblings. These are noted as unusual additions to the game, which is seemingly altered by Ender's interaction with the computer.

Graff promotes Ender to lead his own squad, which is made up of students who have gained Ender's trust. They are put in increasingly difficult battles. In a surprise match against two other teams, including Bonzo's Salamander Army, Ender devises a novel strategy of sacrificing part of his team to achieve a goal, impressing Graff.

Bonzo attacks Ender in the bathroom after the match, but Ender fights back. Bonzo falls during the struggle and suffers a head injury. Distraught, Ender quits Battle School, but Graff has Ender's sister  Valentine convince him to continue.

Graff takes Ender to humanity's forward base on a former Formic planet near their homeworld to meet with an elder Rackham.  Rackham explains that the Formics share a hive-mind mentality and how he exploited it to win the battle. Ender finds that his former squad members are also there to help him train in computerized simulations of large fleet combat; Rackham puts special emphasis on the fleet's Molecular Detachment (MD) Device that is capable of disintegrating matter. Ender's training is rigorous, and Anderson expresses concern over this, but Graff notes they have run out of time to replace Ender.

Ender's final test is monitored by several fleet commanders. As the simulation starts, Ender finds his fleet over the Formic homeworld, vastly outnumbered. He orders most of his fleet to sacrifice themselves to protect the MD long enough to fire on the homeworld. The resulting chain reaction burns over the surface of the planet, killing the entire population. The simulation ends, and Ender believes the test is over. The commanders restart the video screens, showing that Ender's fleet actually participated in live missions and destroyed the Formic homeworld.  Realizing he became a murderer for destroying the planet as well as feeling guilt for the Formics, Ender storms off only to be tranquilized by staff.

While asleep, Ender is awoken by the Formic Queen and is directed to a Formic structure nearby as being similar to the ruined castle from the game. The Queen acknowledges Ender's role in the genocide and moves to kill him, but when Ender shows remorse, she spares his life. It is determined that the Formic were only seeking a source of water and did not want conflict. The Queen gives Ender a Queen egg that she has been protecting.

With the war ended, Ender is promoted to admiral, given a small ship, and left to his own devices. In a letter to Valentine, he confides that he is going into deep space, determined to start a new Formic colony with the Queen egg.

Cast

Production

Development 

Since Ender's Game was published in 1985, author Orson Scott Card had been reluctant to license film rights and artistic control for the novel. Card explained that he had many opportunities through the 1980s and 1990s to sell the rights of Ender's Game to Hollywood studios, but refused when creative differences became an issue. With the formation of Fresco Pictures in 1996 (which Card co-founded), the author decided to write the screenplay himself. In a 1998 interview, Card discussed the process of adapting the novel into a screenplay.

In 2003, Card submitted a screenplay to Warner Bros., at which time David Benioff and D. B. Weiss were hired to collaborate on a new script in consultation with the then-designated director Wolfgang Petersen. Four years later, Card wrote a new script not based on any previous ones, including his own. In an interview with Wired, Card admitted two obstacles in writing his scripts were being able to "externalize" Ender's thoughts and making it work, "for people who had never read the book."

Card announced in February 2009 that he had completed a script for Odd Lot Entertainment, and that they had begun assembling a production team. In September 2010, it was announced that Gavin Hood was attached to the project, serving as both screenwriter and director. Card said he had written "about six" different scripts before Hood took over. In November 2010, Card stated that the film's storyline would be a fusion of Ender's Game and its parallel novel, Ender's Shadow, focusing on the important elements of both. In October 2013, he explained that this "buddy-movie approach" between Ender and Bean was a proof of concept and once Hood took over he decided to use Petra as more of a major character. On January 28, 2011, it was reported that Alex Kurtzman and Roberto Orci would be producing the work and would begin presenting the script to prospective investors.

On April 28, 2011, it was announced that Summit Entertainment had picked up the film's distribution and Digital Domain joined Odd Lot Entertainment in a co-production role. Gavin Hood was aboard as director and screenwriter, and Donald McAlpine joined as cinematographer. The producers were Gigi Pritzker and Linda McDonough of Odd Lot Entertainment, Alex Kurtzman and Roberto Orci of K/O Paper Products, Robert Chartoff and Lynn Hendee of Chartoff Productions, who had worked with Card on the development of the film for over 15 years, Card himself, and Ed Ulbrich. Executive producers included Bill Lischak, David Coatsworth, Ivy Zhong and Deborah Del Prete. In an interview with Brigham Young University newspaper The Universe, Card said that his role as producer was in the early stages and that the screenplay is 100% Hood's. Special effects workshop Amalgamated Dynamics provided the special character effects for the film, with founder Tom Woodruff Jr. providing character suit performances.

Casting 
In a 1999 interview, Orson Scott Card confirmed that Jake Lloyd was under consideration for the role of Ender Wiggin, asking fans not to judge Lloyd based on his performance in The Phantom Menace, saying that a better script and direction would result in a better performance. In July 2008, Card stated that he would like to see Nathan Gamble play Ender, and expressed regret that he was "probably too old" for the part. Early in the film's development, in an interview in 1998, Card considered changing Hyrum Graff to a female character, recommending a "dry comic" such as Janeane Garofalo or Rosie O'Donnell for the role. In the same interview, Card suggested Andre Braugher or Will Smith for the role of Mazer Rackham. Brendan Meyer was originally cast in the role of Stilson, but had to leave the production due to a scheduling conflict.

Filming 
Production began in New Orleans, Louisiana, on February 27, 2012. The film was released on November 1, 2013, in the United States.

Media

Soundtrack 

The original soundtrack for Ender's Game was released on October 22, 2013. The film's score was composed by Steve Jablonsky. Originally, James Horner was announced to compose the film's score, but it turned out that Jablonsky would be doing the score.

The credits roll song was recorded by The Flaming Lips featuring Tobacco, titled "Peace Sword", which was sold separately as an EP.

Books 

Ender's Game: Inside the World of an Epic Adventure is a reference book published by Insight Editions. With a foreword by Ender's Game film director Gavin Hood, the book is broken into four parts: Ender's World, Battle School, Inside Zero-G, and Parallel Worlds. The book is filled with behind-the-scenes images of the making of Ender's Game as well as interviews with the producers, artists, directors, and cast. Included with the book are nine Battle School army logo stickers, an ID Badge for Ender, and two removable International Fleet posters.

Board game 

Ender's Game Battle School is the official board game based on the film Ender's Game. Published on November 13, 2013, by Cryptozoic Entertainment, the game is designed by Matt Hyra. Played inside the Battle Room, the player takes control of an Army led by either Commander Ender Wiggin or Commander Bonzo Madrid. With different abilities granted to each Commander, the Armies try to either capture each of its opponent's Gates or freeze the opposing Commander while avoiding other frozen players and Stars.

Other merchandise 
Along with various T-shirts, a 2014 wall calendar, and film inspired covers for both the novel and the Ender's Game Ultimate Collection comic collection, Funko released two Pop! Vinyl figurines of Ender Wiggin and Petra Arkanian. Ender's Game is also the first film to offer 3D printed replicas of in-film 3D assets. Summit Entertainment collaborated with Sandboxr, a 3D printing service, to open a new merchandising platform offering fans the unique ability to customize and build 3D prints from assets used in production.

Marketing 

Ender's Game partnered with Audi to bring the Audi fleet shuttle quattro to the motion picture. The partnership with ICEE included releasing two limited time flavors: Battle School Blastberry and Orbital Orange, along with a "Train Like an Astronaut" sweepstakes. Growing Basics offered a chance to win a trip to the Los Angeles premiere of Ender's Game. The Langers Juice Company gave away an Ender's Game T-shirt with three proof-of-purchase. Barnes & Noble also offered various promotions including novels collected in boxed sets inspired by the film. Pik-Nik offered a chance to win a trip for a family of four to the Kennedy Space Center. Popcorn, Indiana held a sweepstakes to win a private screening for the winner and up to 250 friends. Star Studio also offered photobooth backgrounds from Ender's Game.

Websites 
On May 6, 2013, the official movie site for Ender's Game, I.F. Sentinel, launched (I.F. stands for International Fleet, the entity responsible for training the children cadets). Though the site is now filled with short, movie promotional posts, the original site contained new canonical information and characters from the film universe, including archivist Stephen Trawcki, I.F. Major Gerald Stacks, I.F. Academic Secretary Gwen Burton, I.F. Rationing Spokesman Reed Unger, and former Hegemon James van Laake.

On July 17, a recruitment video was released telling users to go to the I.F. Battle School website. Once there, users would be prompted to log onto their Facebook accounts and take a short aptitude test, which when finished would place the user into either Asp, Dragon, Rat, or Salamander Army. Armies would go on to compete against one another in different missions. The first missions involved the users sharing their army assignments on Facebook and Twitter. Doing so unlocked a preview of the film. The second mission had the users compete by once again posting to Facebook and Twitter to try to get their names on a mosaic IMAX poster. The Dragon Army won both missions. The final mission had the users enter sweepstakes from Xbox, IMDb, Yahoo!, and Fandango. There was no winner for the final mission. On September 3, the Battle Room Training game was released on the website. In this game, the user would shoot at different colored stars.

A website called Battle School Command Core opened on September 19, 2013. The website was for those residing in the United Kingdom. The site had six games with a prize for each, including a grand prize trip for two people to NASA.

Boycott 
In July 2013, the group Geeks OUT boycotted the film in protest at Orson Scott Card's views on homosexuality and same-sex marriage.  The calls for a boycott were picked up by a number of other groups and individuals in the media.

In response to the boycott, Card released a statement in July 2013 to Entertainment Weekly: 

Producer Roberto Orci responded in Entertainment Weekly in March that he was not aware of Card's views when he took on development of the film adaptation. He said that "the movie should be judged on its message, not the personal beliefs of the original author", who had minimal involvement in the film. Orci also stated that "if it's on the screen, then I think it's fair game." Lionsgate released a statement stating that "we obviously do not agree with the personal views of Orson Scott Card", while highlighting the company's longtime support of the LGBT community.

Release 
This was the last film to be distributed theatrically by Buena Vista International in Japan before the Japanese theatrical brand was renamed Walt Disney Studios Motion Pictures International starting with Need for Speed in March 2014.

Reception

Box office 
Ender's Game was the number one film in North America during its opening weekend, earning $27 million from 3,407 theaters with an average of $7,930 per theater. The film ultimately grossed $61.7 million domestically and $63.8 million internationally, for a worldwide gross of $127.9 million. The film lost a projected $68 million for the studio, with Variety including it in its list of the "Hollywood's Biggest Box Office Bombs of 2013".

Critical response 
On Rotten Tomatoes, the film has an approval rating of 62% based on 225 reviews, with an average rating of 6.10/10. The critical consensus states: "If it isn't quite as thought-provoking as the book, Ender's Game still manages to offer a commendable number of well-acted, solidly written sci-fi thrills." On Metacritic, the film has a score of 51 out of 100 based on reviews from 39 critics indicating "mixed or average reviews". Audiences polled by CinemaScore gave the film a grade B+.

Peter Debruge of Variety magazine called it "An impressive, thought-provoking astro-adventure that benefits from the biggest screen available."
Richard Roeper of the Chicago Sun-Times praised "the stunning and gorgeous visuals covering every inch of the screen" and describes the film as a "challenging adventure that should satisfy most young fans of the book while keeping the adults engrossed as well."

Marc Bernardin of The Hollywood Reporter is critical of the lack of empathy and shallowness of the story, and wrote: "If only adapter-director Gavin Hood's movie had been tempered with craft and care and wasn't such a blunt instrument, one that seems designed as a delivery system for CGI derring-do instead of the heartbreaker it should be." Bernardin notes the zero-gravity battle scenes might have seemed to be unfilmable, and he commends the special effects, but says the film was unlucky to have come out so soon after Alfonso Cuaron's Gravity, which did it far better. 
Peter Bradshaw of The Guardian called the film "pacy and visually pleasing despite an overload of ideas". Bradshaw concludes: "The movie's apocalyptic finale indicates that it's bitten off considerably more than it can chew in terms of ideas, but it looks good, and the story rattles along."
Simon Abrams of RogerEbert.com says, "The movie... is way too kind, and the drama suffers greatly for it...The film's biggest problem is a matter of tone and characterization: the characters constantly talk about how mean they can be, but their actions suggest otherwise."

Joe Neumaier of the New York Daily News gave the film zero stars, and called it "one of the dullest, dumbest, most tedious movies this year. It makes "Battlefield: Earth" and "John Carter" look like "The Godfather" parts 1 and 2. "Dune" is "Lawrence of Arabia" next to this thing."
Joe Morgenstern of The Wall Street Journal wrote: "Not only does "Ender's Game" have many scenes in zero gravity, but this zero-sum fiasco has zero drama, zero suspense, zero humor, zero charm and zero appeal."

Home media 
On February 11, 2014, Ender's Game was released on DVD, Blu-ray, VOD, and PPV, with an early Digital HD window beginning January 28. The DVD includes deleted / extended scenes with optional audio commentary with Director Gavin Hood and audio commentary for the film with Producers Gigi Pritzker and Bob Orci. The Blu-ray also includes an 8-part featurette called "Ender's World: The Making of Ender's Game" and a featurette called "Inside the Mind Game".

Potential sequel 
In November 2013, cast member Aramis Knight, who played Bean, said a script for Ender's Shadow existed, which Hood wanted to film concurrently with Ender's Game, but there was not enough money. Hood discussed a potential sequel as well, noting the Children of the Fleet novel may be more desirable as a follow-up than the next novel in the series, Speaker for the Dead. Given the first film's unspectacular box office compared to its budget a sequel is considered unlikely, and  there is no news of a sequel being in the works.

See also 
 List of films featuring space stations

References 
Informational notes

Citations

Further reading

External links 
Official media sites
 

Movie databases
 
 
 

Other links
 Ender's Game at the Encyclopedia of Science Fiction
 

2013 films
2010s adventure films
2013 science fiction action films
American films with live action and animation
American science fantasy films
American science fiction action films
American science fiction adventure films
American science fiction war films
American space adventure films
American teen films
Films about child soldiers
Films about extraterrestrial life
Films based on American novels
Films based on science fiction novels
Films directed by Gavin Hood
Films produced by Robert Chartoff
Films produced by Roberto Orci
Films scored by Steve Jablonsky
Films set in the 22nd century
Films shot in New Orleans
Films set on fictional planets
Odd Lot Entertainment films
K/O Paper Products films
IMAX films
Ender's Game series
LGBT-related controversies in film
Summit Entertainment films
Lionsgate films
Films using motion capture
Alien invasions in films
Mass murder in fiction
Military science fiction films
Teen action films
Teen science fiction films
2010s English-language films
2010s American films